Ernest Gibson may refer to:

 Ernest Willard Gibson (1872–1940), U.S. representative and senator from Vermont
 Ernest W. Gibson Jr. (1901–1969), governor and U.S. senator from Vermont, son of Ernest Willard Gibson
 Ernest W. Gibson III (born 1927), Vermont Supreme Court judge
 Ernest Gibson (American football) (born 1961), former American football cornerback